The 2028 Republican National Convention is an event in which delegates of the United States Republican Party will select the party's nominees for president and vice president in the 2028 United States presidential election. Nashville, Tennessee, and Houston, Texas have been said to be potential contender cities to host the convention.

References 

Republican National Conventions